Birdie Viola Draper (1916-2005) was a parachutist and stunt performer who made her first jump on June 6, 1937. She traveled around the country as a member of the Thrill Day Performers and became known as the "Queen of the Daredevils."

Early life 
Draper was born in  Minneapolis, Minnesota in 1916. In 1937 at the age of 20, Draper began her training as a parachutist with Stub Chrissinger, an instructor for Hincks flying service and one of two licensed parachute riggers in Minnesota.

Career 
After her training, Draper joined the stunt group Thrill Day Performers traveling to State Fairs. She was paired up with Captain F. F. "Bowser" Frakes who was best known for his daring plane crashing stunts and was known as the "Monarch of the Air." Draper was recognized for crashing through sixteen sticks of dynamite with her car, as well as solid masonry walls, a stunt for which she received $42.50.

By 1940, Draper completed thirty-five parachute jumps. She retired in 1941 as a daredevil once she received her license as a parachute rigger from the Department of Commerce. Shortly afterwards she took a position as a rigger for Ryan Aeronautical Company. Draper married George Griffin, a local attorney, and retired from Ryan Aeronautical Company in 1945.

Draper died on November 1, 2005.

References

External links 

 https://sandiegoairandspace.org/collection/item/birdie-draper-collection Birdie Draper Collection at the San Diego Air and Space Museum
 https://www.flickr.com/photos/sdasmarchives/albums/72157650330477326 Images from the Birdie Draper Collection on Flickr.

American stunt performers
1916 births
2005 deaths